#2 ¡Una mas! is the second studio album by Japanese girl idol group Juice=Juice. It was released on 1 August 2018 on the label Hachama.

Release 
The album was released in two editions: a regular edition and a limited edition. The limited edition included an additional Blu-ray disc.

Chart performance 
The album debuted and peaked at number 4 in the Japanese Oricon weekly album charts. It also ranked on number 7 Japan Billboard HOT 100 and reached the Billboard album charts at number 4 with 13,945 first week sales.

Track listing

Charts

References

External links 
 Profile of the album on the official website of Hello! Project
 Profile of the album on the official website of Up-Front Works

Juice=Juice albums
2018 albums
Up-Front Group albums